Hermann Föttinger (9 February 1877 in Nuremberg – 28 April 1945 in Berlin) was a German engineer and inventor. In the course of his life he submitted over 100 patent applications, but he is most notable for inventing fluid coupling.

Career
From 1895 to 1899 Hermann Föttinger studied electrical engineering at the Technical University of Munich.

AG Vulcan Stettin
From 1904 he worked as a chief designer in the shipyard AG Vulcan Stettin. He was responsible for the introduction and testing of new steam turbines. During this time he developed the fluid coupling consisting of a pump and a turbine in a unit that in further development resulted in the automatic automobile transmission.

Technische Hochschule in Danzig
In 1909 he obtained a position at the Technische Hochschule in Danzig where he started the institute for fluid dynamics technology.

Technical University of Berlin
In 1924 he took up a position as head of the current department of physics and turbines at the Technical University of Berlin. Here he remained until his death from grenade fragments in April 1945.

Achievements

Fluid dynamics
Föttinger laid the basis of the fluid dynamics from Euler over Rankine and Hermann von Helmholtz to its current uses in the boundary layer of airplane wings and propulsion theory.

Railcars
Together with Franz Kruckenberg he started the Flugbahn-Gesellschaft mbH to develop the Schienenzeppelins (railroad cars).

Internal combustion engines
Föttinger's patents for internal combustion engines include:
 US1636050, Device for damping the oscillations of multiple crank shafts
 US2244453, Scavenging of two-stroke cycle internal combustion engines

Literature
 Hans Jürgen Reuß: ' 'Hermann Föttinger' '. In: Journal (2008) internationally maritime HANSA, 6, S.  58-59. Hamburg: Navigation publishing house "Hansa" C. Schroedter & Co. (Gmbh & Co. KG),2008.

References

External links
 http://www.hfi.tu-berlin.de/Foettinger/Projekte/SVT137155/svt137155.pdf description of SVT 137 155
 
 
 detailed representation Föttingers life and creating  the institute for current mechanics and technical acoustics of the TU Berlin, ehem. Hermann-Föttinger-institute for current mechanics
 in/volltexte/2008/2012/html/festschrift/foettinger.htm biography in the commemorative volume ' '125 years University of Berlin' technical '

1877 births
1945 deaths
20th-century German inventors
German electrical engineers
Fluid dynamicists
Technical University of Munich alumni
Academic staff of the Gdańsk University of Technology
Academic staff of the Technical University of Berlin
Engineers from Nuremberg
People from the Kingdom of Bavaria
German civilians killed in World War II
Deaths by hand grenade